David Muir Wood  is an academic working in the field of geomechanics (the mechanics of geomaterials) and soil mechanics, famous for having pioneered advances in mathematical modelling of soils, informed by experimental observation.
The hallmark of his modelling efforts has been to formulate elegant models that capture the essence of the material response while being accessible to practitioners of Geotechnical engineering.

David Muir Wood is author of a number of books for academic audiences as well as for the general public.

Education 

David Muir Wood obtained his BA degree at Cambridge University in 1970, where he proceeded onto his MA.

Career 
David Muir Wood obtained his PhD in Cambridge in 1974 under the supervision of Peter Wroth. The title of this work is 'Some aspects of the mechanical behaviour of kaolin under truly triaxial conditions of stress and strain'
He then continued onto a Research fellowship between Cambridge and Norwegian Geotechnical Institute in 1975 followed by a lectureship, Cambridge (1975-1987).
He was then appointed Professor of Civil Engineering, University of Glasgow, 1987-1995 (Head of Department, Dean of Engineering).
He then moved onto Professor of Civil Engineering, University of Bristol, 1995-2009 (Head of Department, Dean of Engineering), retired 2009.
Since 2009 he a Professor of Geotechnical Engineering at the  University of Dundee, and Emeritus since 2014

Recent/current Visiting professorships:
 Politecnico di Milano, Italy
 Chalmers University of Technology Gothenburg, Sweden
 University of Western Australia, Australia
 TU Dresden, Germany
 University of Innsbruck, Australia
 Yokohama National University, Japan

Awards 
He is a fellow of the following institutions:
 Fellow of the Institution of Civil Engineers (FICE), since 1992
 Fellow of the Royal Academy of Engineering (FREng), since 1998
 International Honorary Member, Japanese Geotechnical Society, since 2010
 Fellow of the Royal Society of Edinburgh (FRSE), since 2012

Bibliography 

David Muir Wood is the author of a number of academic books:
 
 
 

As well as a large number of academic articles, some of the most significant of which are:
 
 
 
 
 
 
 

At least one book for the general public in the Very Short Introduction series:

Personal life 
David Muir Wood is the son of Alan Muir Wood and Winifred Leyton Lanagan

References 

1949 births
Living people
Fellows of the Royal Society of Edinburgh
Fellows of the Royal Academy of Engineering
Alumni of Peterhouse, Cambridge
Academics of the University of Glasgow
Academics of the University of Bristol
Academics of the University of Dundee
Geotechnical engineers